Atypeek Music is an international digital label, which resulted from the association of Go Get Organized (GGO) and Agony. GGO is one of the last French alternative labels (1988 – 1993). The name of the label Go Get Organized comes from a song by the Redskins; it enhances the commitment of this generation's independent labels. It was founded in 1988 by a group of artists and musicians. The label explored a surprisingly large panel of genres at the time, going through garage rock, hardcore, stoner rock, grunge, noise music, no wave, jazz-core and industrial music. The label soon stands out from other French labels and the alternative music stage by looking for on unusual artists, taking a particular interest in grunge music, American noise rock, experimental and minimalist music such as the work of the very controversial Patrick Dorobisz, Witches Valley, Lucrate Milk, Moodie Black, Dookoom, Genghis Khan, Les Vulves Assassines or Schlaasss.
In 1992, the label signs a licensing agreement for Monster Magnet’s first album Spine Of God with Primo Scree. In 1993, the label changes its name and becomes Agony (Agony and the Ecstasy). Agony (1993 – 2012) then became GGO, turning more toward noise rock with bands such as Enablers, Davy Jones Locker, Hint, Condense, Heliogabale or Kill the Thrill before becoming Atypeek Music in 2013. It is also during this year that its previous productions and new artists are shared on digital platforms. Artists released on Atypeek Music: Barbara Panther, Chris Conde, Ben Sharpa, Anne Horel, Palo Alto, Oto... Atypeek Music stays under the artistic direction of Christophe Féray. Atypeek Music has taken in artists from partner labels like Disques Futura et Marge (Futura Marge), Noise Product, Dokidoki, Solar Flare, Permis de Construire Deutschland (PDCD), micr0lab and RecRec Music. Atypeek Music's distributed on iTunes and all the major digital music distribution stores. In 2016, the structure publishes the first issue of the magazine "Atypeek Mag", a collaborative music and generalist magazine. In 2021, Atypeek Music and the label Jarring Effects join forces to create a new label called Daaganda Records (Daisy Mortem, UltraMoule).

Artists

Current artists

 10PUTE
 300
 (The True) Scorpio Rising 
 Abandon
 Achwghâ Ney Wodei
 Across The Waves
 Adrien Kessler
 Aghostino
 Alfie Ryner
 Allister Sinclair 
 Al'Tarba 
 Amantra
 Anarchist Republic of Bzzz
 Anne Horel 
 Apollonius Abraham Schwarz
 April Fishes
 Arne Vinzon 
 Arto Lindsay 
 A Shape 
 Brice et sa Pute
 Ça
 Cable Regime 
 Cantenac Dagar
 Caspar Brötzmann-Massaker 
 Chaman Chômeur
 Chantal Morte 
 Chevo Légé
 Chewbacca 
 Chromb!
 Clara Clara
 Claude Favre / Nicolas Dick
 Coax Orchestra 
 Condense
 Cop Shoot Cop 
 Cosmic Wurst 
 Çub 
 Cut The Navel String
 Davy Jones Locker
 Daikiri 
 Dark Radish 
 Dead Oldman (dědъ)
 Deborah Kant 
 Derby Derby 
 Deux Boules Vanille
 Devilish Piranhas
 Dookoom
 Doppler
 Double Nelson
 Dum Dum Boys
 Eliogabal
 Emboe
 Enablers
 Enob 
 Fall Of Because
 Faro 
 F.A.T.
 FAT32
 Fisherman
 Fragment.
 Fred Frith
 Gabriel Hibert 
 Geins't Naït 
 Genghis Khan
 Gerard Jugno 106
 Gift Of Blindness 
 G.I. Love
 Gin Palace
 Gore / Hoer*
 Goz of Kermeur
 Greyfell 
 Grill
 Hal
 Have The Moskovik
 Heliogabale
 Hems
 Herr Geisha And The Boobs
 Hippie Diktat 
 HoaxHoax
 Icsis
 In Love With
 Infecticide
 ISaAC
 I, Useless
 June Bug
 Kai Reznik
 Kill the Thrill
 Kouma
 Krackhouse
 Laurent Pernice
 Lèche Moi
 L'Effondras
 Louis Minus XVI
 Lucrate Milk
 Lynhood
 Mad River
 Mank Down
 Marteau Mu
 Margaret Catcher
 Marvin
 Massicot
 Mata 
 Melaine Dalibert 
 Membrane
 Mia Vita Violenta 
 Microfilm
 MilesDavisQuintet!
 Miles Oliver 
 Milkilo
 Mismerizer 
 Moodie Black
 Moist
 Mortar (Various Artists) - Cable Regime - Cop Shoot Cop - Nox - Caspar Brötzmann-Massaker - Gore / Hoer - Fall Of Because - Grill
 Namoro
 Ned
 Neige Morte
 Ni
 Nicolas Dick
 Noise Gate
 Nox
 Noyades 
 Nyah Fearties 
 Oblik
 Oto
 Owls Are Not
 Owun
 Patrick Dorobisz
 Penthouse
 Philippe Petit 
 Polymorphie
 Pore
 Postcoïtum 
 Projet O - Nà
 Projet O - Marmalade
 Pù  
 Queen Elephantine
 Rature 
 Red City Noise
 $afia Bahmed-Schwartz 
 Sathönay 
 Schlaasss 
 Sheik Anorak 
 Shotgun Babies
 Simiam Lucis
 Sisygambis
 Sliding Words
 Snap
 Spectrum Orchestrum
 Spook
 Stoned Diplodocus 
 Suzanne'Silver 
 Table
 Tapso II
 Ted Milton meets Goz of Kermeur
 Théo Ceccaldi
 Térébenthine
 Terminal Cheesecake
 The Automatists
 The Crooner Of Doom
 The Dirteez
 This Is Daddy Long Legs 
 This Side of Jordan
 Thompson Rollets
 The Wøøøh
 Tim
 Time to Burn
 Tombouctou
 Tout de Suite
 Toy Killers
 Toys'R'Noise
 Traître Câlin
 Tripes
 Ueno Park - Manuel Adnot solo
 uKanDanZ 
 Ultra Panda
 Vesicatoria
 Videoiid
 Waveland 
 William Hooker Quartet
 Witches Valley
 WRISTS 
 Xavier Saïki
 You Freud, Me Jane 
 Zarboth

Discography

 Thompson Rollets - Crazy Soldier / Never Be Like You + Bitch - Digital publishing (2013) (Atypeek Music) - Record producer: Brett Myers 
 Witches Valley - Do You Like It? + Here's To You - Digital publishing (2013) (Atypeek Music)
 Witches Valley -Extreme Return To The Source - Digital publishing (2013) (Atypeek Music) - (ADFR)
 Dum Dum Boys - In A Cotton Candy World - Digital publishing (2013) (Atypeek Music)
 G.I. Love - Chemical Gardens - Digital publishing (2013) (Atypeek Music)- Record producer: Cecil English 
 Davy Jones Locker - Palpable - Digital publishing (2013) (Atypeek Music)
 Sisygambis - Four Stages Of Cruelty - Digital publishing (2013) (Atypeek Music)
 The Automatists - Bad Queen Ep - Digital publishing (2013) (Atypeek Music)
 Pore - Rotation - Digital publishing (2013) (Atypeek Music) - (PDCD)
 Kill the Thrill - Dig - Digital publishing (2013) (Atypeek Music) - (Noise Product)
 Nicolas Dick - Une Belle Journée - Digital publishing (2013) (Atypeek Music)
 Time To Burn - Is.Land - Digital publishing (2013) (Atypeek Music)
 The Dirteez - The Wild Side Of Love - Digital publishing (2013) (Atypeek Music)
 Davy Jones Locker - Green Album - Digital publishing (2013) (Atypeek Music)- Record producer: Kramer
 Noise Gate - Peace & Work - Digital publishing (2013) (Atypeek Music) - (Noise Product)
 Heliogabale - Yolk - Digital publishing (2013) (Atypeek Music)
 (The True) Scorpio Rising - Phallus Imperator - Digital publishing (2013) (Atypeek Music)
 Goz Of Kermeur - Irondelles - Digital publishing (2013) (Atypeek Music) - (Noise Product)
 Davy Jones Locker - I Shake My Head (EP) - Digital publishing (2013) (Atypeek Music)
 Time To Burn - Starting Point - Digital publishing (2013) (Atypeek Music)
 Time To Burn - Burn the lie down - Digital publishing (2013) (Atypeek Music)
 Heliogabale - To Pee - Digital publishing (2013) (Atypeek Music)
 (The True) Scorpio Rising - I Know You But You don’t Know Me - Digital publishing (2013) (Atypeek Music)
 ISaAC - Herpès Maker - Digital publishing (2013) (Atypeek Music)
 Patrick Dorobisz - Sneeuw - Digital publishing (2013) (Atypeek Music)
 Patrick Dorobisz - Couleurs et lumière - Digital publishing (2013) (Atypeek Music)
 Noise Gate - Illusion of Victory - Digital publishing (2013) (Atypeek Music) - (Noise Product)
 Davy Jones Locker - S/T - Digital publishing (2013) (Atypeek Music)
 Sisygambis - Interficias te Ipsum - Digital publishing (2013) (Atypeek Music)
 Ted Milton Meets Goz Of Kermeur - Inflated Edge - Digital publishing (2013) (Atypeek Music) - (Noise Product)
 Kill the Thrill - Low - Digital publishing (2013) (Atypeek Music) - (Noise Product)
 Time To Burn - B Sides - Digital publishing (2013) (Atypeek Music)
 Pore - Dorsale - Digital publishing (2013) (Atypeek Music) - (PDCD)
 Claude Favre & Nicolas Dick - Autopsies - Digital publishing (2013) (Atypeek Music)
 Sisygambis (feat. Gérard Giachi) - Pour en finir - EP - Digital publishing (2013) (Atypeek Music)
 Davy Jones Locker - Ultimate - Digital publishing (2013) (Atypeek Music)
 Abandon - Tunnels - Digital publishing (2013) (Atypeek Music)
 Térébenthine - Terebenthine - Digital publishing (2013) (Atypeek Music)
 (The True) Scorpio Rising  - Brain Catalogue - Digital publishing (2013) (Atypeek Music)
 Davy Jones Locker - Single - Digital publishing (2013) (Atypeek Music)
 Goz of Kermeur - Goz of Kermeur - Digital publishing (2013) (Atypeek Music) - (Noise Product)
 ISaAC / Térébenthine - IT - (SPL)IT Vinyle (Atypeek Music - Poutrage Records - Ocinatas Industries) - Digital publishing (2014) (Atypeek Music)
 Witches Valley - Rien Résiste Aux Racines - Digital publishing (2014) (Atypeek Music)
 Abandon - House of Cards - Digital publishing (2014) (Atypeek Music)
 (The True) Scorpio Rising  - The Invisible Society - Digital publishing (2013) (Atypeek Music)
 Abandon - Monsters - Digital publishing (2014) (Atypeek Music)
 Mortar - Various Artists - Cable Regime - Cop Shoot Cop - Nox - Caspar Brötzmann-Massaker - Gore / Hoer - Fall Of Because - Grill - Digital publishing (2014) (Atypeek Music) (PDCD)
 Hems - Lourd comme l’air - Digital publishing (2014) (Atypeek Music)
 Grill - Light - Digital publishing (2014) (Atypeek Music) - (PDCD)
 Hal - Gorilla Conspiration - Digital publishing (2014) (Atypeek Music) - (PDCD)
 Lucrate Milk - I Love You Fuck Off - Digital publishing (2014) (Atypeek Music)
 Fragment. - Temporary Enlightenment - Digital publishing (2014) (Atypeek Music)
 Nyah Fearties - A Tasty Heidfu''' - Digital publishing (2014) (Atypeek Music)
 Witches Valley - Extrem Return To The Source - Digital publishing (2014) (Atypeek Music) (Auto Da Fé)
 Mad River - Face To The Sea - Digital publishing (2014) (Atypeek Music)
 Laurent Pernice - Détails - Digital publishing (2014) (Atypeek Music) (PDCD)
 (The True) Scorpio Rising - The Blues Resurrection Project - Digital publishing (2014) (Atypeek Music)
 Mad River - Shining - Digital publishing (2014) (Atypeek Music)
 Red City Noise - Rmx - Digital publishing (2014) (Atypeek Music)
 Kouma - Brazilian Blowout - Digital publishing (2014) (Atypeek Music)
 Deborah Kant - Terminal Rail / Route - Digital publishing (2014) (Atypeek Music)
 uKanDanZ - Lantchi Biyé / Endè Iyèrusalém - Single - Digital publishing (2014) (Atypeek Music)
 Red City Noise - Black Lodge - Digital publishing (2014) (Atypeek Music)
 Hippie Diktat - Black Peplum - Digital publishing (2014) (Atypeek Music)
 Heliogabale - Mobile Home - Digital publishing (2014) (Atypeek Music)
 Snap - Bras - Digital publishing (2014) (Atypeek Music)
 Kouma - Kouma - Digital publishing (2014) (Atypeek Music)
 Sheik Anorak - Keep your hands low - Digital publishing (2014) (Atypeek Music)
 Alfie Ryner - Brain Surgery - Digital publishing (2014) (Atypeek Music)
 Zarboth - Zarboth - Digital publishing (2014) (Atypeek Music)
 Polymorphie - Voix - Digital publishing (2014) (Atypeek Music)
 Zarboth - Kwakiutls - Digital publishing (2014) (Atypeek Music)
 Devilish Piranhas - Greetings from the Voodoo Island of Lust! - Digital publishing (2014) (Atypeek Music)
 Heliogabale - Diving Rooms - Digital publishing (2014) (Atypeek Music)
 Coax Orchestra - Lent et sexuel - Digital publishing (2014) (Atypeek Music)
 Moist - Face Pack - Digital publishing (2014) (Atypeek Music)
 Goz of Kermeur - Mythoman - Digital publishing (2014) (Atypeek Music)
 Heliogabale - Mystery Trains - Xquisite - EP - Digital publishing (2014) (Atypeek Music)
 Laurent Pernice - Axident - Digital publishing (2014) (Atypeek Music)
 WRISTS - The Censorship Trap - Digital publishing (2015) (Atypeek Music)
 L'Effondras - L'effondras - Digital publishing (2015) (Atypeek Music)
 This Side Of Jordan - Set the Record Straight - Digital publishing (2015) (Atypeek Music)
 L'Effondras - Ferrum Movendo / Helleboros - Single - Digital publishing (2015) (Atypeek Music)
 Enablers - The Rightful Pivot - Digital publishing (2015) (Atypeek Music)
 Heliogabale - Blood - Digital publishing (2015) (Atypeek Music)
 Eliogabal - Mo - Digital publishing (2015) (Atypeek Music)
 Laurent Pernice - Exit to the City (Sortie Vers La Ville) - Digital publishing (2015) (Atypeek Music)
 Marteau Mu - Philitosa - Digital publishing (2015) (Atypeek Music)
 Owls Are Not - 2 - Digital publishing (2015) (Atypeek Music)
 Xavier Saïki - Moraine - Digital publishing (2015) (Atypeek Music)
 Shotgun Babies - Private Games - Digital publishing (2015) (Atypeek Music)
 Aghostino - Collarbones Full of Cocoons - Digital publishing (2015) (Atypeek Music)
 Membrane - Membrane - Digital publishing (2015) (Atypeek Music)
 Ni - Les insurgés de Romilly - Digital publishing (2015) (Atypeek Music)
 Gift of Blindness - Gift of Blindness - Digital publishing (2015) (Atypeek Music)
 Schlaasss - Slaasssch - Digital publishing (2015) (Atypeek Music)
 WRISTS - STSIRW - Digital publishing (2015) (Atypeek Music)
 WRISTS - Mountain of Skulls - EP - Digital publishing (2015) (Atypeek Music)
 Sathönay - Gaziosmanpasa - Digital publishing (2015) (Atypeek Music)
 Massicot - Morse - Digital publishing (2015) (Atypeek Music)
 Queen Elephantine - Omen - Digital publishing (2015) (Atypeek Music)
 Toy Killers - My Name Is Dirtier - Digital publishing (2015) (Atypeek Music)
 Jacques Barbéri & Laurent Pernice - L'apocalypse des oiseaux - Digital publishing (2015) (Atypeek Music)
 Laurent Pernice - Sept autres créatures - Digital publishing (2015) (Atypeek Music)
 Krackhouse - Comes Alive - Digital publishing (2015) (Atypeek Music)
 Ça - 24615 - Digital publishing (2015) (Atypeek Music)
 Sheik Anorak - Or - Digital publishing (2015) (Atypeek Music)
 HoaxHoax - Shot Revolver - Digital publishing (2015) (Atypeek Music)
 Kill the Thrill - 203 Barriers - Digital publishing (2015) (Atypeek Music)
 Enablers - Berlinesque - Digital publishing (2015) (Atypeek Music)
 Herr Geisha and The Boobs - Book of Mutations - Digital publishing (2015) (Atypeek Music)
 L'Effondras - Lemures / Je reste avec vous - Single - Digital publishing (2015) (Atypeek Music)
 Kill the Thrill - Tellurique - Digital publishing (2015) (Atypeek Music)
 Cut The Navel String - Takis - Digital publishing (2015) (Atypeek Music)
 Infecticide - Chansons tristes - Digital publishing (2015) (Atypeek Music)
 Condense - Bacteria / Ode to a Boss - Digital publishing (2015) (Atypeek Music)
 Vesicatoria - Awakening - Digital publishing (2015) (Atypeek Music)
 Laurent Pernice - Yppah - Digital publishing (2015) (Atypeek Music)
 Double Nelson - Un sentiment étrange - Digital publishing (2015) (Atypeek Music)
 Chantal Morte - No More - Digital publishing (2015) (Atypeek Music)
 Chantal Morte - Short Allemand - Digital publishing (2015) (Atypeek Music)
 Sheik Anorak - Let's Just Bullshit Our Way Through - Digital publishing (2016) (Atypeek Music)
 uKanDanZ - Awo - Digital publishing (2016) (Atypeek Music)
 Heliogabale - Mobile Home - Digital publishing (2016) (Atypeek Music)
 Spook - Blurred Head and Scrambled Eggs - Digital publishing (2016) (Atypeek Music)
 Dookoom - No! - Digital publishing (2016) (Atypeek Music)
 Chaman Chômeur - 18759 - Digital publishing (2016) (Atypeek Music)
 Ultra Panda - The New Bear - Digital publishing (2016) (Atypeek Music)
 Brice et sa Pute - Célibataires - Digital publishing (2016) (Atypeek Music)
 In Love With - Axel Erotic - Digital publishing (2016) (Atypeek Music)
 Enablers - The Achievement - Digital publishing (2016) (Atypeek Music)
 10PUTE - Poupée russe - Digital publishing (2016) (Atypeek Music)
 Suzanne'Silver - Like Lazarus - Digital publishing (2016) (Atypeek Music)
 Laurent Pernice - Infrajazz - Digital publishing (2016) (Atypeek Music)
 April Fishes - Carpe d'or - Digital publishing (2016) (Atypeek Music)
 F.A.T. - Animal - Digital publishing (2016) (Atypeek Music)
 Margaret Catcher - We Want More - Digital publishing (2016) (Atypeek Music)
 Enablers - Now You Can Answer My Prayers - Digital publishing (2016) (Atypeek Music)
 Fragment. - Nothing Will Ever Be the Same - Single - Digital publishing (2016) (Atypeek Music)
 G.I. Love - 16 Hardcore Romances, Far out Experiments, Fuzzy Sounds and Off-Limit Overdrive - Digital publishing (2016) (Atypeek Music)
 Tapso II - Close Distances - Digital publishing (2016) (Atypeek Music)
 Double Nelson - Pousser la voiture - Digital publishing (2016) (Atypeek Music)
 Fragment. - Nothing Will Ever Be the Same - Digital publishing (2016) (Atypeek Music)
 ICSIS - Pierre Vide Eau - Digital publishing (2016) (Atypeek Music)
 WRISTS - Eye Adjust EP - Digital publishing (2016) (Atypeek Music)
 Condense - Placebo - Digital publishing (2016) (Atypeek Music)
 Fragment. - Home - Digital publishing (2016) (Atypeek Music)
 Condense - Genuflex - Digital publishing (2016) (Atypeek Music)
 WRISTS - Power Comes in Many Forms - Digital publishing (2016) (Atypeek Music)
 Mank Down - Thred EP'' - Digital publishing (2016) (Atypeek Music)

See also
 List of record labels
 No wave
 Industrial music
 Grunge
 Noise rock
 Post-rock
 Minimal music
 Hip hop music
 Ambient music
 Shoegazing

References

External links
 
 Atypeek Magazine
 Discography
 Youtube
 Instagram
 Twitter
 TikTok
 Atypeek Mag

Alternative rock record labels
French independent record labels
Industrial record labels
Rock record labels
Record labels established in 1988
Indie rock record labels
Experimental music record labels
Noise music record labels
Psychedelic music
Jazz
Ambient music record labels
Electronic music record labels